WKCC may refer to:

 WKCC (FM), a radio station (90.5 FM) licensed to serve Columbus, Georgia, United States
 WBEK (FM), a radio station (91.1 FM) licensed to serve Kankakee, Illinois, which held the call sign WKCC from 2003 to 2016
 Western Kentucky Correctional Complex, a prison in Kentucky